Periglandula are a genus of fungi in the family Clavicipitaceae. They live as epibionts, in a symbiotic relationship with two species of plant, Ipomoea asarifolia and Ipomoea corymbosa. They are known to produce ergot alkaloids related to lysergic acid.

References

External links 
 

Clavicipitaceae
Hypocreales genera